Sosnowiec Główny railway station is a major railway stations in Sosnowiec, Silesian Voivodeship, Poland. The station is located about 9 km to the East of Katowice railway station. As of 2022, it is served by Polregio (local and InterRegio services) and PKP Intercity (EIP, InterCity, and TLK services).

Train services
The station is served by the following service(s):

Express Intercity Premium services (EIP) Warsaw - Katowice - Bielsko-Biała
Express Intercity Premium services (EIP) Gdynia - Warsaw - Katowice - Gliwice/Bielsko-Biała
Intercity services (IC) Warszawa - Częstochowa - Katowice - Bielsko-Biała
Intercity services (IC) Białystok - Warszawa - Częstochowa - Katowice - Bielsko-Biała
Intercity services (IC) Gdynia - Gdańsk - Bydgoszcz - Toruń - Kutno - Łódź - Częstochowa - Katowice - Bielsko-Biała
Intercity services (IC) Olsztyn - Warszawa - Skierniewice - Częstochowa - Katowice - Bielsko-Biała
Intercity services (IC) Olsztyn - Warszawa - Skierniewice - Częstochowa - Katowice - Gliwice - Racibórz
Regional Service (KŚ)  Gliwice – Zabrze - Katowice – Zawiercie - Częstochowa
Regional services (KŚ)  Tychy Lodowisko - Katowice - Sosnowiec Główny - Dąbrowa Górnicza Ząbkowice - Zawiercie

References

External links
 

Railway stations in Poland opened in 1859
Buildings and structures in Sosnowiec
Railway stations in Silesian Voivodeship
Railway stations served by Przewozy Regionalne InterRegio